Dumitru Moraru (born 8 May 1956) is a Romanian former professional footballer who played as a goalkeeper from 1972 until 1991.

Club career
Dumitru Moraru was born in București, growing up in the Pantelimon neighborhood, where he started playing football in 1966 at the junior teams of Metalul București, where he earned the nickname "Țețe" (Tsetse) after a teammate told him in a cantonment that he sleeps so much as he would have been bitten by a tsetse fly. In two seasons spent at Metalul's senior team, he played 56 games in Divizia B, after which he went to play for Steaua București. He made his Divizia A debut on 25 August 1974, playing for Steaua in a derby against Dinamo București, which ended with a 2–0 loss. He played 24 games in the 1975–76 Divizia A season and 26 in the 1977–78 season, helping Steaua win the title in each of those seasons, also winning the 1975–76 Cupa României. He went to play three seasons for Sportul Studențesc București where he won the 1979–80 Balkans Cup. Moraru was transferred by Sportul Studențesc at Dinamo București in 1981, where he played 31 league games in each of his first three seasons as the club won the title in all of them and was the team's captain in the 1983–84 European Cup season as the club reached the semi-finals, playing 8 games in the campaign. After 8 seasons spent at Dinamo with three Divizia A titles and three Cupa României won, Moraru alongside teammates Costel Orac and Alexandru Nicolae were transferred to Victoria București, but only for a short while, after which he went to play in Norway at IK Start, amassing a total of 41 league appearances over the course of two seasons, after which he ended his career, a career in which he made a total of 393 appearances in Divizia A and 33 in European competitions.

International career
Dumitru Moraru played 38 games for Romania, making his debut on 24 September 1975 under coach Valentin Stănescu in a 1–1 against Greece at the 1973–76 Balkan Cup. He played one game at each of the 1978 and 1982 World Cup qualifiers, also making three appearances at the successful Euro 1984 qualifiers, being used by coach Mircea Lucescu in a 1–0 loss against Portugal in the group stage of the final tournament. Moraru played one game at the 1986 World Cup qualifiers and one at the Euro 1988 qualifiers, making his last appearance for the national team on 30 March 1988 in a friendly which ended 3–3 against East Germany.

Honours
Steaua București
Divizia A: 1975–76, 1977–78
Cupa României: 1975–76
Sportul Studențesc București
Balkans Cup: 1979–80
Dinamo București
Divizia A: 1981–82, 1982–83, 1983–84
Cupa României: 1981–82, 1983–84, 1985–86

Notes

References

External links
 
 
 Romania National Team 1970–1979 – Details
 Romania National Team 1980–1989 – Details

1956 births
Living people
Romanian footballers
Romania international footballers
Olympic footballers of Romania
Romanian expatriate footballers
UEFA Euro 1984 players
Liga I players
Liga II players
Faur București players
FC Steaua București players
FC Sportul Studențesc București players
FC Dinamo București players
IK Start players
Expatriate footballers in Norway
Romanian expatriate sportspeople in Norway
Eliteserien players
Association football goalkeepers